The 1932 German Grand Prix was a Grand Prix motor race held at the Nürburgring on 17 July 1932.

Classification

References

German Grand Prix
German Grand Prix
Grand Prix